Honeymoon rhinitis (or honeymoon nose) is a condition in which the sufferer experiences nasal congestion during sexual intercourse or arousal.

The condition appears to be genetically determined and caused by the presence in the nose of erectile tissue which may become engorged during sexual arousal, as a side effect of the signals from the autonomic nervous system that trigger changes in the genitals of both men and women.  

A related condition called sexually induced sneezing also exists, where people sneeze, sometimes uncontrollably, when engaging in or even thinking about sexual activity.

A phenomenon presumably related to honeymoon rhinitis is the frequent side effect of nasal congestion during the use of sildenafil or related phosphodiesterase type 5 antagonists.

See also
 Snatiation
 Honeymoon cystitis

References

Symptoms and signs: Respiratory system